Selnik is a village east of Golo in the Municipality of Ig in central Slovenia. The entire municipality is part of the traditional region of Inner Carniola and is now included in the Central Slovenia Statistical Region.

A small chapel-shrine in the settlement is dedicated to the Virgin Mary and was built in the early 20th century.

References

External links
Selnik on Geopedia

Populated places in the Municipality of Ig